Gelson is a Portuguese-language masculine given name.

People with the given name Gelson 
Gelson Domingos da Silva (c.1965 – 2011), Brazilian TV cameraman killed while reporting 
Gelson Fernandes (born 1986), Swiss footballer
Joseph Gelson Gregson (1835–1909), English Baptist missionary to India
Gelson Martins (born 1995), Portuguese footballer
Gelson Rodrigues (born 1982), Brazilian footballer
Gelson Silva (born 1967), Brazilian football manager
Gelson Singh (born 1994), Indian cricketer

People nicknamed Gelson 
Geraldo dos Santos Júnior (born 1979), Brazilian footballer known as Gelson
Jacinto Muondo "Gelson" Dala (born 1996), Angolan footballer

See also

Gelson's Markets, supermarket chain in California, US